Barberetta is a genus of herbaceous perennial plants in the family Haemodoraceae. It contains only one known species, Barberetta aurea.

Description 
The upper three tepals have an orange spot at their base. The two upper filaments ascend and slightly diverge, while the lower filament diverges strongly in the direction opposite to the style. The filaments are yellow and carry very short, orange, elliptic anthers. The ovary is a yellow style of m long that is strongly bent sideways and carries an orange coloured stigma. The sap of this plant stains paper red. Barberetta aurea has a base chromosome count of 15 (n=15). Small corms grow in the axils of the bracts that are responsible for vegetative reproduction.

Taxonomy 
Barberetta aurea was described in 1868 by William Henry Harvey. The genus Barberetta is named in recognition of a Mrs. Barber who collected this plant for science. Aurea is a Latin word meaning "golden".

Comparison of homologous DNA has increased the insight in the phylogenetic relationships between the genera in the Haemodoroideae subfamily. The following tree represents those insights.

Distribution, ecology and conservation 
Barberetta aurea is endemic to South Africa (Eastern Cape province and KwaZulu-Natal). Like in the species of the closely related genus Wachendorfia, two types of individuals occur, plants with only flowers with the style curved to the left and plants with flowers with the style curved to the right, and these are both present within the same populations. This so-called floral enantiomorphy is thought to be a mechanism to increase outcrossing and so boost genetic diversity. The species grows in moist and shaded locations. Barberetta aurea is considered a least-concern species.

References 

Endemic flora of South Africa
Haemodoraceae
Monotypic Commelinales genera